Calophyllum bicolor is a species of flowering plant in the family Calophyllaceae. It is found in Australia and New Guinea.

References

bicolor
Malpighiales of Australia
Trees of New Guinea
Least concern flora of Australia
Nature Conservation Act vulnerable biota
Vulnerable flora of Australia
Least concern biota of Queensland
Flora of Queensland
Taxonomy articles created by Polbot